Saint Peter in Penitence or The Penitent Saint Peter is a 1630s painting of Peter the Apostle by Jusepe de Ribera, now in the Museo Soumaya in Mexico City.

Sources
 Seis siglos de arte. Cien grandes maestros. México: Museo Soumaya-Fundación Carlso. 2006. p. 37. .
 Camón Aznar, José (1999). Summa Artis. Historial general del arte. XXIV. Pintura española del siglo XVI (8a. edición). Madrid: Espasa Calpe. p. 101.

1630s paintings
Paintings by Jusepe de Ribera
Ribera